The Devil in Amsterdam is a 1919 Dutch silent film directed by Theo Frenkel.

Cast
 Eduard Verkade - De Duivel
 Louis Bouwmeester - Van Rijn
 Margie Morris - Thérèse
 Annie Wesling - Huisvriendin van Van Rijn
 Jacques Reule - Schilder
 Mientje Kling - Mizzi
 Lily Bouwmeester - Thérèse's zieke zusje
 Julie Meijer
 Philippe La Chapelle
 Wiesje Bouwmeester
 Ernst Winar
 Piet Urban
 Louis Davids

External links 
 

1919 films
Dutch silent feature films
Dutch black-and-white films
Films based on works by Ferenc Molnár
Films directed by Theo Frenkel